Progress and Left Forces Alliance (Greek: Συμμαχία Προοδευτικών και Αριστερών Δυνάμεων, Symmachia) was a coalition of left-wing parties in Greece.

History
The alliance was formed in November 1977 as a coalition of the United Democratic Left, the Communist Party of Greece (Interior),  Socialist March, Socialist Initiative and Christian Democracy. The party won two seats in the November 1977 elections, taken by Ilias Iliou and Leonidas Kyrkos, who represented the United Democratic Left and the Communist Party.

Although not formally disbanded, the alliance ceased to exist by mid-1978.

References

Defunct political party alliances in Greece
Defunct socialist parties in Greece
1977 establishments in Greece
Political parties established in 1977
United fronts
United Democratic Left